Cherokee State Park can refer to

Cherokee State Park (Kentucky)
Cherokee State Park (Oklahoma)
Cherokee State Park (Tennessee)